Hastings was a parliamentary electorate in the Hawke's Bay Region of New Zealand from 1946 to 1996. The electorate was represented by nine Members of Parliament. The Hastings electorate was a typical bellwether electorate, frequently changing between the two main parties.

Population centres
The 1941 New Zealand census had been postponed due to World War II, so the 1946 electoral redistribution had to take ten years of population growth and movements into account. The North Island gained a further two electorates from the South Island due to faster population growth. The abolition of the country quota through the Electoral Amendment Act, 1945 reduced the number and increased the size of rural electorates. None of the existing electorates remained unchanged, 27 electorates were abolished, eight former electorates were re-established, and 19 electorates were created for the first time, including Hastings. The towns of Hastings and Havelock North have always been located within the electorate until the 1987 electoral redistribution, whereas the nearby Fernhill was always included in the adjacent  electorate.

History
The first representative was Ted Cullen of the Labour Party. After two electoral terms, Jones was in turn defeated by Labour's Ted Keating, who served until his defeat in 1960. Subsequent office holders were Duncan MacIntyre (1960-1972), Richard Mayson (1972-1975), Bob Fenton (1975-1978), David Butcher (1978-1990), Jeff Whittaker (1990-1993), and Rick Barker (1993-1996).

Members of Parliament
The Hastings electorate was represented by nine Members of Parliament:

Key

Election results

1993 election

1990 election

1987 election

1984 election

1981 election

1978 election

1975 election

1972 election

1969 election

1966 election

1963 election

1960 election

1957 election

1954 election

1951 election

1949 election

1946 election

Notes

References

Historical electorates of New Zealand
Politics of the Hawke's Bay Region
1946 establishments in New Zealand
1996 disestablishments in New Zealand